The Fortune Buddies is a 2011 Hong Kong comedy film directed by Chung Shu Kai, produced by and starring Eric Tsang. Co-stars include Louis Yuen, Wong Cho-lam and Johnson Lee who are known as "Fuk Luk Sau" (福祿壽), Maggie Cheung, Fala Chen and Pauline Wong, who has been in retirement for years. The film will feature many guest stars including Michael Tse, Bosco Wong and Richard Ng. It is a co-production between Shaw Brothers Studio, Television Broadcasts Limited and Sil-Metropole Organisation. A production start ceremony was held on 17 June 2011 at the Kowloonbay International Trade & Exhibition Centre. The film was released on 11 August 2011.

Cast

References

External links
TVB page

Hong Kong comedy films
2011 films
2011 comedy films
2010s Cantonese-language films
Shaw Brothers Studio films
Films set in Hong Kong
Films shot in Hong Kong
2010s Hong Kong films